Fillon may refer to:

Fillon (surname)
Fillon law, 2005, a French education reform law

See also
Fillion (disambiguation)